Mary Czerwinski is an American cognitive scientist and computer-human interaction expert who works for Microsoft Research as manager of their research group on visualization and interaction.

Czerwinski earned her doctorate in cognitive science from Indiana University. She worked in computer-human interaction for Bellcore, the Johnson Space Center, and Compaq, and also held an adjunct position at Rice University while at Compaq. She moved to Microsoft in 1996, as a usability tester in product development. Two years later, she joined Microsoft Research, as the first social scientist to work there. She works in the visualization and interaction research group managing researchers, designers, and developers doing human-computer interaction research Her main research focus is around large/multiple displays, social and physiological computing, novel information visualizations and interaction techniques She was also an affiliated faculty member with the psychology department at the University of Washington from 1996 to 2009, and has been an adjunct professor in Washington's Information School since 2011. In 2015 she was named a Fellow of the Association for Computing Machinery "for contributions to human-computer interaction and leadership in the CHI community." In 2014, she also received the Distinguished Alumni award from Indiana University's Brain and Psychological Sciences department and will receive a Distinguished Alumni award from the College of Arts and Sciences from Indiana in February, 2018 Czerwinski was awarded the ACM SIGCHI Lifetime Service Award, was inducted into the CHI Academy, and became an ACM Distinguished Scientist in 2010.

Personal life 
Czerwinski currently resides in Redmond, WA.

Education 
 1978-1982—M.A; B.A, Experimental Psychology; Psychology at Ball State University
1982-1988-PhD, Cognitive Psychology at Indiana University Bloomington

Research 
Czerwinski has published over a hundred papers during her time at Microsoft Collectively, her work has been cited over 10000 times since 2016. Her research focuses on emotion tracking, information worker task management, health and wellness for individuals and groups.

References

Year of birth missing (living people)
Living people
American computer scientists
American women computer scientists
American cognitive scientists
Fellows of the Association for Computing Machinery
Indiana University Bloomington alumni
Microsoft employees
Microsoft Research people
Scientists at Bell Labs
Rice University faculty
University of Washington faculty
Information visualization experts
Human–computer interaction researchers
American women academics